Michelle Salzman (born July 5, 1977) is a Republican member of the Florida House of Representatives representing the state's 1st District, which includes the northern portion of Escambia County. She was elected to the seat in November 2020, after she defeated Democratic candidate Franscine Mathis in the general election.  Prior to that she defeated incumbent Mike Hill in the Republican primary in August 2020.

Early life and career 

Salzman was raised in Pensacola, Florida. After graduating high school in 1995, she says she joined the Army when she was 17 to escape an abusive home. Salzman states that her father was an abusive alcoholic and her mother became addicted to opioids when she was in middle school; Salzman has stated that both of her parents died at an early age from opioid addiction. On February 16, 2022, Salzman stated, while debating in support of an anti-abortion bill, that as a child, her uncle regularly sexually abused her and her sister. She served as part of the NATO forces in Bosnia where she says she was raped by her commanding officer while deployed. She got married in the Army, but separated after they had two children. She returned to Pensacola where she became an exotic dancer. She obtained an Associate of Applied Science degree from Pensacola State College

Salzman earned her Bachelor of Science in Business Administration from the University of West Florida.

Volunteering and politics 

Salzman worked as an education chair for Pensacola Mayor Grover Robinson's transition team and is a former County PTA President and member of the Florida PTA Board of Directors. 
Salzman served as a "Safe Schools Equality Index Advisory Member" through Equality Florida. The “Safe School Equality Index” is a  comprehensive tool designed to assist Florida’s Department of Education, District Superintendents , School Board Members, PTA Leaders, District staff and partnering youth centered organizations to meet the rising needs of lesbian, gay, bisexual, transgender, gender non-binary and questioning students in Florida's K-12 schools.

Florida House of Representatives 
Salzman was elected to the Florida House of Representatives in 2020 after defeating incumbent Republican Mike Hill in the primary. She was subsequently re-elected in 2022, defeating Hill in a primary rematch.

Controversies 
In April 2021, Salzman was quoted as saying that the issue holding her back from prioritizing the cleanup of a toxic landfill in her district was that the surrounding residents were Democrats. “They’re Democrats. They vote Democrat,” she said. “I put signs out in Wedgewood, and every time I put them out, the next day, they’d be gone. You know, my dad lives right there … we went through more signs in Wedgewood than anywhere, but there’s just very few people that vote Republican over there.” She continued, “So it’s nothing about the environment, nothing about landfills, nothing like that. So not only is it not the people that don’t vote for me, but it’s also nothing in the priority list of what folks in District 1 said they wanted me to do as a state representative.”

In March 2021, Salzman was accused by Representative Omari Hardy of calling Representative Webster Barnaby the chamber's "token Black Republican." Salzman vehemently denied making the remark.

In February 2022, Salzman was recorded explaining why she would not support a Constitutional Carry bill in the Florida Legislature. She was accused of threatening the group that published the recording.

Committees (2023-24) 

 Appropriations Committee
 Health Care Appropriations Subcommittee   Vice Chair
 Health & Human Services Committee   Republican Committee Whip
 Healthcare Regulation Subcommittee
 Rules Committee

Awards & Recognition 
 InWeekly named Salzman the "Politician of the Year" for the Greater Pensacola Area consecutively each year that she's held office (2021, 2022) during their Best of the Coast issues.
 Pensacola Power List recipient 
 Volunteer of the Year Winner Awarded by InWeekly Magazine in both 2015, 2017, & 2018.

Electoral history

2020

Personal life 
Salzman has two kids from her first husband. She is married to Phil Salzman. She has three children in total. She and Phil live in Escambia County.

See also

 Florida House of Representatives

References

External links
  at Florida House of Representatives
 Michelle Salzman profile at Vote Smart

1977 births
21st-century American politicians
21st-century American women politicians
Living people
Republican Party members of the Florida House of Representatives
Pensacola State College alumni
University of West Florida alumni
Women state legislators in Florida
Female United States Army personnel